The 2016–17 Liga IV was the 75th season of the Liga IV, the fourth tier of the Romanian football league system. The champions of each county association play against one from a neighboring county in a playoff to gain promotion.

Promotion play-off 

The matches are scheduled to be played on 17 and 24 June 2017.

|-
||2–4||0–8
||2–7||0–1
||0–3||2–2
||8–0||6–0
||1–6||0–1
||1–0||3–1
||0–3 (w/o)||6–2
||0–2||2–2
||0–4||2–5
||2–2||0–1
||0–3||0–6
||2–1||3–1
||0–0||0–2
||2–1||3–1
||0–0||1–2
||1–0||4–3 
||4–0||3–1
||1–0||0–2
||1–2||2–3
||1–2||1–3
||1–2||1–3
|}

County leagues

Alba County

Arad County

Argeș County

Bacău County

Bihor County

Bistrița-Năsăud County

Botoșani County

Brașov County

Brăila County 

Championship play-off 
The teams started the championship play-off with half of the points accumulated in the regular season.

Championship play-out 
The teams started the championship play-out with half of the points accumulated in the regular season.

Bucharest 

Championship play-off 
Championship play-off played in a single round-robin tournament between the best four teams of the regular season. The teams started the play-off with the following points: 1st place – 3 points, 2nd place – 2 points, 3rd place – 1 point, 4th place – 0 points.

Buzău County 

Promotion/relegation play-off 
The 14th of Liga IV Buzău County faces the 2nd-placed teams in the two series of Liga V Buzău County.

Caraș-Severin County

Călărași County

Cluj County

Constanța County

Covasna County

Dâmbovița County

Dolj County 

Championship play-off 
Teams started the play-off with their points from the Regular season halved, rounded upwards, and no other records carried over from the Regular season.

Championship play-out 
Teams started the play-out with their points from the Regular season halved, rounded upwards, and no other records carried over from the Regular season.

Galați County

Giurgiu County 
South Series

North Series

Championship play-off 
The championship play-off played between the best two ranked teams in each series of the regular season. All matches were played at Comunal Stadium in Izvoarele on 6 and 7 June 2017 the semi-finals and on 10 June 2017 the final.
Semi-finals

Final

Dunărea Giurgiu won the 2016–17 Liga IV Giurgiu County and qualify to promotion play-off in Liga III.

Gorj County

Harghita County 

Championship play-off 
The teams start ed the play-off with half of the points accumulated in the regular season.

Play-off 
The teams start ed the play-off with half of the points accumulated in the regular season.

Relegation play-out 
The teams start ed the play-out with half of the points accumulated in the regular season.

Hunedoara County

Ialomița County

Iași County

Ilfov County 
Seria 1

Seria 2

Championship final 

||2–4||1–4

Voința Crevedia II won the 2016–17 Liga IV Ilfov County and qualify to promotion play-off in Liga III.

Maramureș County 
North Series

South Series

Championship final 
The championship final was played on 10 June 2017 at Viorel Mateianu Stadium in Baia Mare.

Lăpușul Târgu Lăpuș won the 2016–17 Liga IV Maramureș County and qualify to promotion play-off in Liga III.

Mehedinți County 

Championship play-off 
The teams started the play-off with half of the points accumulated in the regular season.

Championship play-out 
The teams started the play-out with half of the points accumulated in the regular season.

Mureș County

Neamț County 

Championship play-off 
Championship play-off played in a single round-robin tournament between the best four teams of the regular season. The teams started the play-off with the following points: 1st place – 3 points, 2nd place – 2 points, 3rd place – 1 point, 4th place – 0 points. 

All matches were played at Bradul Stadium from Roznov.

Olt County

Prahova County

Satu Mare County

Sălaj County

Sibiu County

Suceava County

Teleorman County

Timiș County

Tulcea County 
Series A

Series B

Championship play-off 
Semi-finals
The 1st leg matches were played on 21 May, and the 2nd leg on 28 May and 4 June 2017.

||2–2||3–3
||3–0||1–0
|}
 Final
The championship final was played on 11 June 2017 at Delta Stadium in Tulcea.

Pescărușul Sarichioi won the 2016–17 Liga IV Tulcea County and qualify to promotion play-off in Liga III.

Vaslui County 

Championship play-off

Vâlcea County 

Relegation play-off 
The 9th and 10th-placed teams of Liga IV Vâlcea faces the 2nd-placed teams in the two series of Liga V Vâlcea.

Vrancea County

See also
 2016–17 Liga I
 2016–17 Liga II
 2016–17 Liga III

References

External links
 FRF

Liga IV seasons
4
Romania